Aku Cintakan Mu  is the sixth studio album from Malaysian pop singer Ziana Zain released on 20 August 2001.

Track listing
 "Terkenang Jua" (Ajai, Amran Omar) – 4:34
 "Fatalistik" (Azlan Abu Hassan, Ucu) – 3:55
 "Cintamani"  (Adnan Abu Hassan, Maya Sari) – 5:19
 "Dilema Malam" (Fauzi Marzuki, Ucu) – 4:41
 "Dibiar Resah" (Salman, Lukhman S.) – 5:22
 "Bagai Gahara" (Pak Ngah, Che Kem) – 5:25
 "Aku Cintakan Mu" (Johari Teh) – 4:33
 "Lara" (Azlan Abu Hassan, Azalea) – 4:44
 "Dengarkanlah" (Ajai, Amran Omar) – 4:15
 "Menadah Gerimis" (Azmeer) – 5:18

Awards

Certification

References

External links
 Fan Site

Ziana Zain albums
2001 albums
Bertelsmann Music Group albums
Malay-language albums